Rowatt is a surname. Notable people with the surname include:

Alison Rowatt (born 1981), Scottish field hockey player
Hugh H. Rowatt (1861–1938), Canadian civil servant
Thomas Rowatt (1879–1950), Scottish engineer

See also
Rowett